The Conservative Alliance (Spanish: Alianza Conservadora, or ALCON) is a Nicaraguan political party founded in 2000 by conservatives loyal to the then President Arnoldo Alemán. The members of ALCON are erroneously referred to as "the purple ones", as the popular thought of mixing the green (conservative) and red (liberal) colors gives purple. As of 2006, ALCON is in the Constitutionalist Liberal Party electoral alliance.
2000 establishments in Nicaragua
Conservative parties in Nicaragua
Political parties established in 2000
Political parties in Nicaragua